The Academia Ecuatoriana de la Lengua (Ecuadorian Academy of Language) is an association of academics and experts on the use of the Spanish language in Ecuador.

The Academia was founded on March 4, 1875, in Quito, following the Real Academia Española giving permission for the creation of national academies in 1870. It aimed to bring together regional intellectual and literary groups. The Academia is the highest cultural institution in Ecuador.

References

Spanish language academies
Ecuadorian culture
1875 establishments in South America
Organizations established in 1875